Hanalei is an indie rock/folk band from the Chicago area, and Bay Area in California. Brian Moss heads the band along with Pete Croke and others from bands such as The Pines. Moss a singer/songwriter from the Bay Area (San Francisco) who later moved to Chicago and back again; his previous bands include Great Apes, The Ghost and The Wunder Years.  Hanalei began as a solo project of Brian Moss after The Ghost broke up, and after one release entitled "We Are All Natural Disasters", Hanalei became a four-piece band, moving away from Postal Service-esque sound , and becoming a folky-earthy  sounding band.

The band released "Parts and Accessories" in 2006.

Discography

Albums
 We Are All Natural Disasters, Thick Records, 2004
 Parts and Accessories, Thick Records, 2006
 One Big Night, Brick Gun Records (US)/Big Scary Monsters(UK), 2010

EPs
 Hurricane We, Self Released, 2003

Splits
 Fifteen / For.The.Win. / Hanalei - Can You Spare Some Change? Split 7", Solidarity Recordings, 2010
Side B: Hanalei - Petroleum Distillation (Fifteen Cover)
 Aspiga / Hanalei - Split 7", Jump Start Records (JST-072), 2012
Side B: Hanalei - Get Gone
Digital Download Only Track: Hanalei - Cut Dead

Live
 Hanalei Live at Schubas 01/07/2005, Re:Live, 2005 - Digital Release

Compilations
 Mean It Man, Thick Records, 2005
Track 9: Action Drum
Track 21: Chamomile (Live)

References

Indie rock musical groups from Illinois